Chris Farren is an American country music songwriter and record producer. He is the president of Combustion Music, a publishing and music production company which was founded in 2001.

After attending East Carolina University, Farren signed with MCA in 1983 for a songwriting contract, with which he composed songs for movies and television. He moved to Nashville, Tennessee, in the mid-1980s and sang backing vocals in addition to writing songs. Farren produced albums by Boy Howdy, Kevin Sharp, and Deana Carter in the 1990s, and was named Country Producer of the Year in 1997 by American Songwriter magazine.

See also
:Category:Song recordings produced by Chris Farren (country musician)

References

American country record producers
American country songwriters
American male songwriters
Living people
Musicians from Los Angeles
Musicians from Nashville, Tennessee
Songwriters from California
Songwriters from Tennessee
Record producers from California
Year of birth missing (living people)